George Hugh Macdonell (February 10, 1851 – April 1, 1920) was a contractor and political figure in Ontario, Canada. He represented Algoma in the House of Commons of Canada from 1891 to 1896 as a Conservative member.

He was born in Toronto, Canada West, the son of Duncan Macdonell, and was educated in Williamstown and at Bishop's College in Lennoxville, Quebec. He continued his education in the military schools of Montreal and served with Colonel Garnet Wolseley in the Red River Expedition. Macdonell operated a warehouse in Montreal for several years. He was then hired by contractors working on the Canadian Pacific Railway, later going into business on his own and moving to Port Arthur. In 1876, Macdonell married Eliza McCracken. Macdonell was also involved in mining and was an insurance agent. Macdonell was mayor of Port Arthur from 1886 to 1888. He ran unsuccessfully for a seat in the Ontario assembly in 1890. Macdonell defeated Daniel Francis Burk in the 1887 federal election but was defeated by Albert Dyment when he ran for reelection to the House of Commons in 1896. His wife, Eliza died in 1893.

He was elected Port Arthur mayor again in 1900 but left to pursue business interests in Manitoba. Later, he was named Dominion Lands Agent for Medicine Hat and then Lethbridge.

George Hugh Macdonnell died in Lethbridge on April 1, 1920. He was buried at the Lethbridge Cemetery.

Electoral record

References 
 
Prominent men of Canada a collection of persons distinguished in professional and political life ... (1892), GM Adam
 F. Brent Scollie, Thunder Bay Mayors & Councillors 1873-1945 (Thunder Bay Historical Museum Society, 2000), 100-101.

1851 births
Members of the House of Commons of Canada from Ontario
Conservative Party of Canada (1867–1942) MPs
Mayors of Port Arthur, Ontario
Bishop's University alumni
1920 deaths